Jakob Miltz (23 September 1928 – 18 February 1984) was a German footballer who played for TuS Neuendorf, Hannover 96 and 1. FC Kaiserslautern.

External links

1928 births
1984 deaths
German footballers
Association football forwards
Germany international footballers
TuS Koblenz players
Hannover 96 players
1. FC Kaiserslautern players
Sportspeople from Koblenz
People from the Rhine Province
Footballers from Rhineland-Palatinate
West German footballers